Majantja Football Club is a professional football club based in Mohale's Hoek (Mohale's Hoek District), Lesotho, that competes in the top tier of Lesotho football known as the Lesotho Premier League. The club was founded in 1932.

Stadium
Currently the team plays at the 1000 capacity Mohale's Hoek.

Honours
Lesotho Premier League winners: 1970-71, 1994-95

Performance in CAF competitions
1972 African Cup of Champions Clubs: 2 appearances
1996 African Cup of Champions Clubs

References

External links
it.soccerway.com
rsssf.com

Lesotho Premier League clubs